The Velthuis system of transliteration is an ASCII transliteration scheme for the Sanskrit language from and to the Devanagari script. It was developed in about 1983 by Frans Velthuis, a scholar living in Groningen, Netherlands, who created a popular, high-quality software package in LaTeX for typesetting Devanāgarī.   The primary documentation for the scheme is the system's clearly-written software manual.  It is based on using the ISO 646 repertoire to represent mnemonically the accents used in standard scholarly transliteration. It does not use diacritics as IAST does. It may optionally use capital letters in a manner similar but not identical to the Harvard-Kyoto or ITRANS schemes.manual para 4.1

See Devanagari transliteration for more information on comparing this and other such transliteration schemes.

The scheme is also used for the transliteration of other Indic scripts and languages such as Bengali and Pali. Moreover, it is also used to transliterate the Roman characters with diacritics used to transliterate Indic scripts in contexts (such as emails) wherein the fonts with these characters cannot be used.

Transliteration scheme 

The Velthuis transliteration scheme is as given in the tables below.

Vowels

Consonants (in combination with inherent vowel a)

Irregular Consonant Clusters

See also

 ITRANS
 Devanagari transliteration
 Harvard-Kyoto
 IAST

External links 
 Sanskrit transliteration.Convert from one scheme to another. Maintained by the 'Indian language technology proliferation and deployment centre' (ILTP-DC) of the government of India. Works with 7 systems: Harvard-Kyoto, ITRANS, Velthuis, SLP, WX-system and IAST, Devanagari. 
Aksharamukha transliteration tool. Akshara Mukha is an Asian script (two way) converter freeware.Works with IAST, ISO, Harvard-Kyoto, ITRANS & Velthuis.
 Online Sanskrit transliteration tool at Shreevatsa

References 

Sanskrit transliteration
Romanization of Brahmic
Devanagari